Beraprost is a pharmaceutical drug used in several Asian countries, including Japan and South Korea, as a vasodilator and antiplatelet agent.  It is classified as a prostacyclin analog.

It has been studied for the treatment of pulmonary hypertension and for use in avoiding reperfusion injury.

Clinical pharmacology
As an analog of prostacyclin PGI2, beraprost affects vasodilation, which in turn lowers blood pressure. Beraprost also inhibits platelet aggregation, though the role this phenomenon may play in relation to pulmonary hypertension has yet to be determined.

Dosage and administration
Beraprost is administered orally as a pill available in strength of 20 mcg.  Dose ranges from 60 to 180 mcg in divided doses after meals.

References

Prostaglandins
Alkyne derivatives
Alkene derivatives
Secondary alcohols